Okrajnik may refer to the following places in Poland:

Okrajnik in Silesian Voivodeship (south Poland)
Okrajnik, Jawor County in Lower Silesian Voivodeship (south-west Poland)